The Moscow Planetarium is a planetarium in Moscow. It is the oldest planetarium in Russia. It was built in 1927-1929, by Constructivist architects Mikhail Barsh, Mikhail Sinyavsky, and engineer Georgy Zunblat.

Closure and reopening
In June 2011, the planetarium was reopened after being closed for 17 years. The building was significantly renovated and expanded, making it, according to the planetarium, the largest planetarium in Europe.

The renovation altered the original design of the planetarium, with the main building raised six meters to fit two additional stories beneath the dome.

References

External links

Buildings and structures in Moscow
Planetaria in Russia
Buildings and structures completed in 1929
Constructivist architecture
Russian avant-garde
Cultural heritage monuments of regional significance in Moscow